Holy Mama is an album by jazz pianist Junior Mance which was released on the Japanese East Wind label in 1976.

Reception

The Allmusic site awarded the album 4 stars stating "These 1976 sessions by pianist Junior Mance are typical for the era, mixing originals, standards, and a modern pop tune. ...This is an excellent date that is well worth seeking out".

Track listing
All compositions by Junior Mance except where noted.
 "By the Time I Get to Phoenix" (Jimmy Webb) - 7:33
 "God Bless the Child" (Billie Holiday, Arthur Herzog, Jr.) - 8:20
 "That Mellow Feeling" - 7:16
 "Holy Mama" - 5:21
 "Miss Otis Regrets" (Cole Porter) - 2:58
 "The Good Old Days" - 5:59
 "Blues for the Schnug" - 6:45

Personnel
Junior Mance - piano 
Martin Rivera - bass
Salvatore LaRocca - drums

References

1976 albums
Junior Mance albums
East Wind Records albums